Tinigua (Tiniguas) is an endangered language isolate spoken in Colombia which used to form a small language family with the now extinct Pamigua language. As of 2000, Tinigua had only two remaining speakers, Sixto Muñoz and his brother, Criterio. Criterio died some time around 2005, leaving only one speaker of Tinigua. They lived in Meta Department, between the Upper Guayabero and Yari rivers. 

Muñoz also speaks Spanish and is thought to have been born somewhere from 1924-1929. He has five children, but he chose not to teach them Tinigua because they would not have any use for it.

References

Further reading

Tiniguan languages
Language isolates of South America
Endangered language isolates